The Roman Catholic Diocese of Hwange is a suffragan diocese in the city of Hwange in the ecclesiastical province of Bulawayo in Zimbabwe.

History
 June 29, 1953: Established as Apostolic Prefecture of Wankie from the Apostolic Vicariate of Bulawayo and Apostolic Vicariate of Salisbury
 March 1, 1963: Promoted as Diocese of Wankie
 April 8, 1988: Renamed as Diocese of Hwange

Leadership
 Prefects Apostolic of Wankie 
 Francesco Font Garcia, I.E.M.E. (1953 – 1956)
 Dominic Ros Arraiza, I.E.M.E. (19 October 1956 – 1963)
Bishops  of Hwange 
 Ignacio Prieto Vega, I.E.M.E. (1 March 1963  – 9 February 1999)
 Robert Christopher Ndlovu (9 February 1999  – 10 June 2004), appointed Archbishop of Harare
 Alberto Serrano, I.E.M.E. (5 December 2006 – 5 July 2021)
 Raphael Macebo Mabuza Ncube (5 July 2021 – present)

See also
Roman Catholicism in Zimbabwe

References

Sources
 GCatholic.org
 

Roman Catholic dioceses in Zimbabwe
Christian organizations established in 1953
Roman Catholic dioceses and prelatures established in the 20th century
Roman Catholic Ecclesiastical Province of Bulawayo